Jarrod Anthony Baxter (born March 9, 1979) is a former fullback in the NFL and current assistant coach for the Westside High School Wolves in Houston. He played for the Houston Texans and Arizona Cardinals from 2002 to 2005. He was drafted in the fifth round of the 2002 NFL Draft.

References

External links
Jarrod Baxter's stats at ESPN

1979 births
Living people
American football fullbacks
Arizona Cardinals players
Houston Texans players
New Mexico Lobos football players
Players of American football from Dayton, Ohio